St. Mary's School is a historic Roman Catholic school building in Wilmington, New Castle County, Delaware. It was built in 1866 to serve children of parishioners of the adjacent St. Mary of the Immaculate Conception Church.  It housed a parochial school until 1979, after which it was occupied by the Elementary Workshop Montessori Schooluntill 2014 Then it housed Pine Street Learning Academy a Pre-School and Early Childhood Education Center.  It is a three-story, five bay by four bay, brick structure with a low hipped roof in the Italianate style.  It features a wooden box cornice around the entire roof line.

It added to the National Register of Historic Places in 1983.

References

External links
Elementary Workshop Montessori School website

School buildings on the National Register of Historic Places in Delaware
Irish-American culture in Delaware
Italianate architecture in Delaware
School buildings completed in 1866
Schools in Wilmington, Delaware
Defunct schools in Delaware
1866 establishments in Delaware
National Register of Historic Places in Wilmington, Delaware